Filip Arsenijević (born 2 September 1983) is a Serbian footballer. He is older brother of Nemanja Arsenijević.

Club career
Born in Titovo Užice, SR Serbia, SFR Yugoslavia, between 2001 and 2009 he played in Serbian clubs FK Sloboda Užice, OFK Beograd, FK Mačva Šabac, FK Sevojno and FK Javor Ivanjica. Between 2009 and 2011 he has been in Greece playing with Panthrakikos in the Greek Super League.

On 30 August 2011 he returned to Serbia and signed a one-year deal with top league club FK Jagodina. Later, he spent the 2012 season playing with the Kazakhstan Premier League team FC Shakhter Karagandy and winning the national title, before returning to Jagodina by early 2013 in time to help the team with the Serbian Cup.

Honours
Javor Ivanjica
Serbian First League: 2007–08

Shakhter Karagandy
Kazakhstan Premier League: 2012

Jagodina
Serbian Cup: 2013

References

External links
 
 

1983 births
Living people
Sportspeople from Užice
Serbian footballers
Serbian expatriate footballers
Association football midfielders
FK Sloboda Užice players
OFK Beograd players
FK Mačva Šabac players
FK Sevojno players
FK Javor Ivanjica players
Panthrakikos F.C. players
FK Jagodina players
FC Shakhter Karagandy players
FK Novi Pazar players
Trikala F.C. players
A.E. Sparta P.A.E. players
FK TSC Bačka Topola players
Serbian SuperLiga players
Serbian First League players
Super League Greece players
Football League (Greece) players
Kazakhstan Premier League players
Serbian expatriate sportspeople in Greece
Serbian expatriate sportspeople in Kazakhstan
Expatriate footballers in Greece
Expatriate footballers in Kazakhstan